Antonio Smareglia (5 May 1854 – 15 April 1929) was an Italian opera composer.

Life
Antonio Smareglia was born in Pola (in the Istrian peninsula, under the Austria-Hungarian Empire, now in Croatia). In the house where he was born in Via Nettuno there is now a small museum of his life and work.

His father Francesco Smareglia from Pola was Italian, his mother Giulia Stiglich from Lovran was Croatian.

The composer chose to set his most famous opera, Nozze istriane, in his grandfather's village, Dignano d'Istria.

Smareglia married Maria Jetti Polla, and they had five children. He became blind at the age of 46. Since then he composed his music dictating to his sons, Ariberto and Mario, and to his students and friends including Primo dalla Zonca, Gastone Zuccoli, and Vito Levi.

Smareglia died in Grado in 1929.

Works
 Caccia lontana (a one-act dramatic sketch, a student work, 1879)
 Preziosa (opera, 1879)
 Bianca da Cervia (opera, 1882)
 Re Nala (opera, 1887)
 Il vassallo di Szigeth (opera, 1889)
 Cornill Schutt (revised as Pittori Fiamminghi, opera, 1893)
 Nozze istriane (opera, 1895)
 La falena (opera, 1897)
 Oceàna (opera, 1903)
 Abisso (opera, 1914)

Notes

References
.
.

External links
Antonio Smareglia (1854–1929) at Sveučilišna knjižnica u Puli.
.

1854 births
1929 deaths
19th-century classical composers
20th-century classical composers
Istrian Italian people
Italian classical composers
Italian male classical composers
Italian people of Croatian descent
People from Pula
Italian opera composers
Male opera composers
Italian Romantic composers
20th-century Italian composers
20th-century Italian male musicians
19th-century Italian male musicians